Chirothrips is a genus of insects belonging to the family Thripidae.

The genus was first described by Haliday in 1836.

The genus has cosmopolitan distribution.

Species:
 Chirothrips manicatus (Haliday, 1836)

References

Thripidae
Thrips genera